In mathematics, more particularly in the field of algebraic geometry, a scheme  has rational singularities, if it is normal, of finite type over a field of characteristic  zero, and there exists a proper birational map 

 

That is, 

If there is one such resolution, then it follows that all resolutions share this property, since any two resolutions of singularities can be dominated by a third.

Formulations
Alternately, one can say that  has rational singularities if and only if the natural map in the derived category

is a quasi-isomorphism. Notice that this includes the statement that  and hence the assumption that  is normal.

There are related notions in positive and mixed characteristic of 
 pseudo-rational
and
 F-rational 

Rational singularities are in particular Cohen-Macaulay, normal and Du Bois.  They need not be Gorenstein or even Q-Gorenstein.

Log terminal singularities are rational.

Examples

An example of a rational singularity is the singular point of the quadric cone 

Artin showed that 
the rational double points of algebraic surfaces are the Du Val singularities.

See also
Elliptic singularity

References

Algebraic surfaces
Singularity theory